Jefferson High School is a public high school in Sioux Falls, South Dakota, United States. It opened in the 2021–2022 school year as part of the Sioux Falls School District. Jefferson High School is one of four traditional high schools in the Sioux Falls School District.

History 
In January 2019, the Sioux Falls School District approved the naming of Jefferson High School and the initial design plans of the new building in Sioux Falls, however, the final design was finalized in spring 2019. Students enter the school from Marion Road and the building sits on the east side of the land. Construction started in June 2019 and was completed in the summer of 2021. Jefferson High School opened in the fall of 2021. 

In March 2019, the district announced the school's mascot will be the "Cavaliers" and its colors will be Kelly green, gold, and black. The mascot was taken from the University of Virginia, which Jefferson founded, and the colors were vetted to ensure they were unique and not the same as nearby schools which they may compete against. They were selected via a committee of students from options narrowed down with votes, they have been approved by the school board.

In 2021 another school, New Tech High School merged with the newly built Jefferson High School. Albeit renamed to Project Based Learning or "PBL" in the H-Wing.

References 

Education in Sioux Falls, South Dakota
Public high schools in South Dakota